Sarmarutilus rubilio,  known as the rovella or the South European roach, is a species of freshwater fish in the family Cyprinidae. It is native in the Tuscano-Latium district of Italy, both in waters draining to the Adriatic and Tyrrhenian Seas,  and introduced further south in the country. Its natural habitats are rivers and freshwater lakes. It is threatened by introduced species and habitat loss.

S. rubilio is the single species in the genus Sarmarutilus, which was separated from the broader roach genus Rutilus in 2014. The Sarmarutilus lineage is thought to have originated in the Sarmatic area in the Middle Miocene and reached the Mediterranean area during the Lago Mare phase, and then survived only in the Tuscany-Latium district.

The sister group of Sarmarutilus is the genus Leucos of five roach species. Unlike Rutilus and Leucos, Sarmarutilus is a riverine fish of running waters. It differs from Leucos by having large pearl organs on the central part of head and body scales of males. From Rutilus it differs in the pharyngeal teeth formula and by its small size.

References

External links

Fish described in 1837
Cyprinid fish of Europe
Endemic fauna of Italy
Leuciscinae
Taxa named by Charles Lucien Bonaparte